Wheatley is an English surname which translates into Old English as "from the wheat meadow". Alternative spellings include Wheatly, Whatley, Whitley, Wheetley, and Wheatleigh. Whether this is an association of work, or of origin, is debatable. It is probable that the now fairly common surname and its derivatives originate from one who farms wheat. However, the surname "de Wheatley" ("of Wheatley") was in use from around the 12th century, and ascribed to some of those that came from the town of Wheatley in Oxfordshire, England, which was founded around 956 AD. It was also around the 12th century that the custom of adopting a father's name, or his profession, as a surname, became more prevalent.

Other theories ascribe to the belief that most of the ancestry comes from a John Wheatland, who was a very wealthy land owner in Surrey, England. The Wheatland name was then corrupted into Wheatley, Wheatleigh, and in some cases Wheatly.

People
 Alan Wheatley, actor
 Andrew Wheatley, Jamaican politician
 Ben Wheatley, animator, director
 Charlie Wheatley (1893–1982), American baseball player and inventor
 Clare Wheatley (born 1971), British football player and administrator 
 Doug Wheatley, comic book artist
 Dennis Wheatley, author
 Francis Wheatley (disambiguation), several people
 Glenn Wheatley (1948–2022), Australian musician, talent manager and tour promoter
 Geoffrey W. Wheatley
 Henry B. Wheatley, author
 Jane Wheatley
 Joan Wheatley, American singer
 Jo Wheatley, winner of The Great British Bake Off (series 2)
 Joe Wheatley, English footballer
 John Wheatley (disambiguation), several people
 Keith Wheatley (born 1946), English cricketer
 Kevin Arthur Wheatley, Australian soldier
 Leon F. Wheatley (1872–1944), New York politician
 Margaret J. Wheatley, management consultant
 Martin Wheatley, British financier
 Sir Mervyn Wheatley, English politician
 Colonel Moreton John Wheatley, CB, RE (1837–1916), Bailiff of The Royal Parks
 Natalio Wheatley
 Ossie Wheatley, English cricketer
 Paul Wheatley (disambiguation), several people
 Peter Jaffrey Wheatley, British chemist
 Phil Wheatley
 Phillis Wheatley, poet
 Rebecca Wheatley, actor
 Ron Wheatley, English footballer
 Thomas Wheatley (1821–1883), English mechanical engineer
 Tyrone Wheatley (born 1972), American football player
 Tyrone Wheatley Jr. (born 1997), American football player
 Willard Wheatley (1915–1997), Chief Minister of the British Virgin Islands
 William Wheatley (1816–1876), American actor
 William O. Wheatley Jr. (born c. 1944), American TV executive

Fictional characters 
 Nicky Wheatley in the British soap-opera Coronation Street

See also
List of Old English (Anglo-Saxon) surnames
Whateley (disambiguation)
Whately (disambiguation)
Whatley (disambiguation)

Surnames
English-language surnames
Surnames of English origin
Surnames of British Isles origin